William Alfred Cate (22 November 1878 – 22 October 1939) was a cricketer who played four matches of first-class cricket for Wellington between 1908 and 1922, and represented New Zealand in 1922–23.

Alf Cate worked as a wool classer in Wellington, and taught wool classing at the Hutt Valley Memorial Technical College for 25 years. He and his wife had a daughter.

He made his first-class debut in 1908, but then had to wait until 1920 before he played again, partly because Wellington had New Zealand representative wicket-keepers in Jeremiah Mahoney and James Condliffe in this period, but also because he was unable to make himself available. Despite his age (44) and lack of first-class experience, Cate replaced Condliffe as New Zealand's wicket-keeper in the third of the three matches New Zealand played against MCC in 1922–23. It was his last first-class match.

The former New Zealand captain Tom Cobcroft, writing in the New Zealand Truth, regarded Cate still as New Zealand's best wicket-keeper in 1925, when Cate was 47, hampered by ill-health, and playing only club cricket for Petone in Wellington.

See also
 List of Wellington representative cricketers

References

External links

1878 births
1939 deaths
New Zealand cricketers
Pre-1930 New Zealand representative cricketers
Wellington cricketers
Sportspeople from Upper Hutt
Wicket-keepers